Yang Ik-june (born October 19, 1975) is a South Korean actor and film director. He is best known for the 2009 film Breathless, which he wrote, directed, edited, and starred in.

Career
Born in Seoul in 1975, Yang graduated from the Department of Entertainment & Acting at the Kongju Communication Arts College. After discharge from his military service, Yang studied theatre and trained at the Actor's 21 Academy before delving into the film industry. In the next six years he starred in 30 short films, and won the Best Actor award at the Mise-en-scène Short Film Festival for the 2005 short film Ooh, You Make Me Sick. In 2005 he directed his first short film, Always Behind You, which earned him the Audience Award at the Seoul Independent Short Film Festival. He also played minor roles in more than ten mainstream films such as Les Formidables, Maundy Thursday, and Viva! Love.

But it was Breathless, his semi-autobiographical feature directorial debut in which he also played the lead role, that catapulted Yang into star director status. Breathless was selected for the Asian Cinema Fund which provided post-production support, and the low-budget film had its world premiere at the 2008 Busan International Film Festival. It proceeded to receive much critical acclaim, winning 23 prizes in the international film festival circuit including a Tiger Award at Rotterdam. Upon its theater release in Korea, the film performed better than expected at the box office with 130,000 admissions, a rare accomplishment for an independent film.

Yang then starred in a supporting role in the 2010 comedy/road movie Looking for My Wife (also known as Runaway from Home). In 2011, he was a voice actor for The King of Pigs, an adult animated film on violence and bullying. He also directed the short films Departure and Immature that same year. Immature was funded by the Jeonju International Film Festival and released as part of the omnibus A Time to Love. Another short film Shibata & Nagao, a comedy inspired by actor's workshops and co-produced with Japan, won the Best Korean Short Film Award at the Asiana International Short Film Festival in 2012. Yang made his television acting debut in the melodrama The Innocent Man, imbuing his supporting role as a small-time thug with an air of menace. In 2013 he was among four celebrities who directed a short film using smartphone Samsung Galaxy S4 with the theme "Meet a Life Companion"; his short Dance Together focused on a Japanese woman who encounters someone new through a cell phone after experiencing the pain of a parting.

Filmography

Television shows

Awards and nominations

References

External links

 Yang Ik-june at Prain TPC
 
 
 

1975 births
Living people
South Korean film directors
South Korean screenwriters
South Korean film editors
South Korean male film actors
South Korean male television actors
20th-century South Korean male actors
21st-century South Korean male actors
Best Supporting Actor Asian Film Award winners